Sayed Mohammed Jaffer Sabt Abbas (born 25 August 1985) is a Bahraini footballer currently playing with Muharraq and the Bahrain national football team.

See also
 List of men's footballers with 100 or more international caps

References

External links
 
 Sayed Mohammed Jaffer at RSSSF

1985 births
Living people
Bahraini footballers
Bahrain international footballers
2004 AFC Asian Cup players
2015 AFC Asian Cup players
Footballers at the 2006 Asian Games
FIFA Century Club
Malkiya Club players
Al-Muharraq SC players
Bahraini Premier League players
Association football goalkeepers
Asian Games competitors for Bahrain
AFC Cup winning players